Rugby sevens at the 2016 Summer Olympics was held over six days in August 2016 in Rio de Janeiro. The 2016 Olympics was the debut for rugby sevens at the Summer Olympics, though rugby union was last played at the 1924 games.

The usual laws of rugby sevens applied.

Changes

Though rugby has not been featured in the Olympics since the 1924 Summer Olympics in any form, the IOC chose to re-introduce the seven-a-side version of the sport for the games. The sport will feature for this olympics and the 2020 Summer Olympics.

Venue

The rugby competition took place in a temporary arena at Deodoro Stadium. The original plan was to stage the rugby matches at the São Januário Stadium. However this was scrapped because the club in charge of the venue missed the deadline to present its project. The Organising Committee considered Estádio Olímpico João Havelange, which would have had to have been shared with the athletics competitions. It was later announced that the rugby competition will take place in a temporary arena at Deodoro Stadium, shared with the modern pentathlon. In April 2016 concerns were raised by the World Rugby head of competitions and performance, Mark Egan, about progress of construction at the temporary 15,000-seater stadium.

Qualification 
Brazil men’s and women’s teams automatically qualified for the events. Qualification began with the 2014–15 Sevens World Series (men's) and 2014–15 World Rugby Women's Sevens Series, where the 4 teams at the top of the standings qualified for the 2016 Olympic Games.  In June–September 2015, each of the six regional rugby unions held an Olympic qualification event, where one team from each region qualified.  The final spot will be determined by a repechage tournament. It will comprise 16 teams from the regional qualifiers: 4 from Europe, 3 from Africa, 3 from Asia, 2 from Oceania, 2 from North America and 2 from South America.

As a result of Great Britain competing as one union in the Olympics and as several in international rugby (England, Wales, Scotland and Northern Irish players that choose to play for the Irish Rugby Union), should one of either the England, Wales or Scotland teams qualify then Great Britain will be awarded a spot in the Olympic Games.  These three British unions agreed in advance of the 2013–14 men's and women's Sevens World Series that their highest-finishing teams in that season would represent all three unions in the first stage of qualification in both 2014–15 series. The England men's and women's teams earned the right to represent the British unions in that stage of their respective competitions. The unions will then decide the composition of the Great Britain team. Players based in Northern Ireland are part of the Irish Rugby Football Union and the IRFU demanded that Northern Irish players, that have committed to play for the Irish rugby union, only play for Ireland despite being eligible under IOC rules to compete for Great Britain.

The world governing body for the sport renamed itself from the International Rugby Board to World Rugby (WR) effective 19 November 2014.

Men's tournament

Women's tournament 

1. South Africa won the continental qualifier, but did not participate in the 2016 Olympics. The South African Sports Confederation and Olympic Committee's qualification criteria do not permit qualification via the continental route. Kenya, as the second-placed team in the African qualifiers, advanced to the Olympics.

Men's competition

Group stage

Group A

Group B

Group C

Knockout stage

Women's competition

Group stage

Group A

Group B

Group C

Knockout stage

Competition schedule
The competition will run August 6–11.

In the Men's tournament, pool A consists of Fiji, Argentina, USA and Brazil. Pool B includes South Africa, Australia, France and Spain while pool C consists of New Zealand, Great Britain, Kenya and Japan.

In the Women's tournament pool A consists of Australia, USA, Fiji and Colombia. Pool B includes New Zealand, France, Spain and Kenya while pool C consists of Canada, Great Britain, Brazil and Japan.

Medal summary

Medal table

Winners

 Injury replacement. IOC later provided a 13th medal to Fiji & SA for injured players.

Team issues

Great Britain and  Northern Ireland

The international structure of rugby union with respect to Great Britain and Northern Ireland is similar to that of association football, but with its own unique features. In football, the four Home Nations within the United Kingdom (England, Wales, Scotland and Northern Ireland) all field separate national teams, which led to a controversy over how to field a combined Great Britain football team at the 2012 Olympics. The Republic of Ireland fields its own national team in football. In rugby union, the three Home Nations that share the island of Great Britain also have their own national teams. Ireland, by contrast, is not divided for rugby purposes—the sport is organised on an All-Ireland basis, with a single governing body for the entire island. Great Britain will get a chance to field a combined team.

This structure led to some minor issues regarding participation of a Great Britain team in the qualifying stages of the 2016 Games. Due to a tradition of cooperation between the governing bodies of England, Wales, Scotland and Ireland—especially during the quadrennial tours of the Southern Hemisphere by the unified British and Irish Lions 15-a-side team—these were far less contentious than in football; as early as 2011, World Rugby (then known as the International Rugby Board) endorsed the concept of a united Great Britain team for the 2016 Games.

In August 2012, a provisional plan was announced by which England, Scotland and Wales would all be able to qualify as a Great Britain sevens team for the 2016 Games. The first qualifying stage is planned to be the 2014–2015 men's Sevens World Series and World Rugby Women's Sevens Series, with the top four teams of each sex at the end of that season advancing to the Games. All three nations are "core teams" that participate in every event of the men's Sevens Series; the Women's Sevens Series began in 2012–2013 with England as one of the six core teams. Qualifying will continue with regional tournaments and a final worldwide Olympic qualifier. Should any of the three teams finish in a qualifying spot at any stage, Great Britain will send a team to the Games. The final composition of a Great Britain team would then be determined by the three nations and the British Olympic Association.

As is the case with olympic boxing, rugby in Ireland is organised on an all-island basis. This means that Northern Irish players who have chosen to represent Ireland in rugby, despite the fact that they are residents of the UK, must play for the IRFU and thus must compete for Ireland.  Northern Irish players who have qualified to play international rugby for the other home nations could still play for Great Britain.

Brazil
Another issue was to make Brazil's automatically qualifying team competitive. In an attempt to address this for the women's tournament, the IRB announced in August 2013 that Brazil would be an invited core team in the Women's Sevens World Series for at least the 2013–14 season.

See also
Rugby union at the Summer Olympics (15-a-side Rugby union, 1900–1924)
Wheelchair rugby at the 2016 Summer Paralympics

References

External links

 
 
 
 Results Book – Rugby Sevens

 
rugby sevens
2016
2016 rugby sevens competitions
International rugby union competitions hosted by Brazil
Rugby sevens competitions in Brazil
Rugby sevens competitions in South America